Ngazargamu, Birni Ngazargamu, Birnin Gazargamu, Gazargamo or N'gazargamu, was the capital of the Bornu Empire from ca. 1460 to 1809.

It was located in the fork of the Komadugu Gana River and the Komadugu Yobe, near present-day Geidam.

The city became Bornu's leading center for Islamic education under Idris Alooma.

In 1808, Gazargamo was taken by the Fulani Jihad.

References

Bibliography
Barth, Heinrich: Travels and Discoveries in North and Central Africa, 3 vols., New York 1857-8 (see vol. III, p. 29-31).
Louis Brenner: The Shehus of Kukawa, Oxford 1973 (p. 20, 32–34).
Lange, Dierk: A Sudanic Chronicle: the Borno Expeditions of Idrīs Alauma, Wiesbaden 1987 (p. 114-7).

External links
 https://web.archive.org/web/20070822212911/http://www.yobestategov.com/ngazargamu.htm
 https://web.archive.org/web/20041029144503/http://unx1.shsu.edu/~his_ncp/Kanem-Bornu.html
 https://web.archive.org/web/20070928151648/http://www.travelsyt.com/borno-state.htm

Archaeological sites in Nigeria
History of Northern Nigeria
Bornu Empire
Former populated places in Nigeria